The Owens River Gorge is a steep 10 mi (16 km) canyon on the upper Owens River in eastern California in the United States. The canyon is located at the eastern edge of the Sierra Nevada mountains in southern Mono County, along the stretch of the river where it exits the Long Valley near its source and enters the north end of Owens Valley. The gorge is a popular destination for rock climbing.

Geology

The Owens River Gorge was formed when the Owens River cut through the Bishop Tuff: a layer of welded ash formed from the eruption of the Long Valley Caldera. This erosion exposed the tuff layers, including rare columnar rhyolite formations.

Water restoration
The Los Angeles Department of Water and Power constructed the Long Valley Dam at the head of the Owens River Gorge as part of a hydropower project in 1941, and completely dewatered the 16-km Lower Gorge reach from 1953 to 1991. Beginning in 1991, a limited range of flows
has been released to rewater the reach, recreate riparian habitat, and reestablish a brown trout sport fishery while maintaining hydropower
diversions.

References

External links
Owens River Gorge: Climbing Guide
Using Historical Geomorphic Analysis to Characterize Pre-dam Flow Regimes in Ecologically Meaningful Terms Matt Smeltzer, Neil Lassettre
The Mono Basin Project DWP

G01
Canyons and gorges of California
Landforms of Mono County, California
Landforms of the Sierra Nevada (United States)